Jackfish Lake is a large body of shallow water in central Saskatchewan, Canada. Communities on or near the lake shore include Meota, Metinota, Cochin and Aquadeo. The nearest airport is at North Battleford. The lake is accessed from Highways 4, 26, 697, 674, and 204.

Jackfish River, located at the lake's southern end, is the primary outflow. It exits the lake at the southern end and flows south into the North Saskatchewan River. Charette Creek, Jackfish Creek, and a short stream from Murry Lake at Cochin are the primary inflows.

Parks and recreation 
The lake is surrounded by several beaches, with three campgrounds, over 300 campsites and several hiking trails at The Battlefords Provincial Park. Meota Regional Park is located at the southern end of the lake beside Meota.

Fishing 
Fish commonly found in the lake include perch, walleye, pike, burbot and whitefish.

Images

See also
List of lakes of Saskatchewan

References

External links 

Meota No. 468, Saskatchewan
Lakes of Saskatchewan